A tree may explode when stresses in its trunk increase due to extreme cold, heat, or lightning, causing it to split suddenly.

Causes

Cold

Cold weather will cause some trees to shatter by freezing the sap, because it contains water, which expands as it freezes, creating a sound like a gunshot.  The sound is produced as the tree bark splits, with the wood contracting as the sap expands.  John Claudius Loudon described this effect of cold on trees in his Encyclopaedia of Gardening, in the entry for frosts, as follows:

Linda Runyon, author of books on wilderness living, recounts her experience of the effect of cold on maple trees as follows:

Wally and Shirley Loudon reported the effect of the freeze of December 1968 upon their orchard in Carlton, Washington as follows:

To the Sioux of The Dakotas and the Cree, the first new moon of the new year is known, in various dialects, as the "Moon of the Cold-Exploding Trees".

Tree sap is a supercooled liquid in cold temperatures.  John Hunter observed, in his Treatise on the Blood, that tree sap within a tree freezes some 17 degrees Fahrenheit below its nominal freezing point.

Lightning

Trees can explode when struck by lightning. The strong electric current is carried mostly by the water-conducting sapwood below the bark, heating it up and boiling the water. The pressure of the steam can make the trunk burst. This happens especially with trees whose trunks are already dying or rotting. The more usual result of lightning striking a tree, however, is a lightning scar, running down the bark, or simply root damage, whose only visible sign above ground is branches that were fed by the root dying back.

Fire

Exploding trees may occur during a wildfire, but there is apparently no evidence of this. The myth of exploding trees may have originated with a classic film about wildfires, Red Skies of Montana, which showed firefighters witnessing exploding trees, based on special effects.

April Fools’ Day hoax
Exploding trees were the subject of a 2005 April Fools' Day hoax in the United States, covered by National Public Radio, stating that maple trees in New England had been exploding due to a failure to collect their sap, causing pressure to build from the inside. The root pressure in a maple tree is approximately 0.1MPa, one standard atmosphere, which is insufficient to cause a tree to explode.

See also

 Frost crack
 Sandbox tree (Hura crepitans), also known as the "dynamite tree"

Footnotes 
  Similar text can be found in the entry for Frost in Charles Hutton's 1795 Mathematical and Philosophical Dictionary

References

External links
 YouTube video with cold weather and bursting tree bark at 43:53, Wild Russia, Episode 6, Primeval Valleys

Tree
Trees